Dicoma swazilandica is a species of plant from Eswatini and South Africa.

Description

Growth form 
It has an erect, straited stem covered with simple white hairs and yellow glands.

Leaves 
Te margins are finely toothed. The upper surface is greenish and often has yellow glands. It may have hairs or be hairless. The lower surface is densely hairy and has glands.

Flowers 
The flowers are borne in typical daisy-like flowerheads. They are borne on erect stalks that may be surrounded by linear leaves. The surrounding whorls of bracts form an inverted cone shape. They grow in five or six )or sometimes seven) rows. They are straw coloured with a purple stripe on the midrib. The margins are finely serrated, especially towards the tips. The innermost bracts are longer than the outer ones and extend about  beyond the pappus.

Each flowerhead contains about 25 florets. They are radially symmetrical and hermaphroditic. The corolla is a dull white in colour and has subepidermal star-shaped calcium oxalate crystals. The epidermal cells have short, glandular twin hairs. The stamens protrude slightly beyond the corolla. The filaments, like the corolla, have star-shaped calcium oxalate crystals. The style also has similar crystals. The stylar branches have sweeping hairs that form a subapical ring. The basal hairs are the longest.

Fruits and seeds 
The rough achenes (dry fruits, each containing a single seed) are covered in ten ribs with hairs growing between them.

Similar species 
This species is most similar to Dicoma anomola. It does, however, differ in several characteristics:

 The leaves of D. swazilandica are linear and flexible while those of D. anomola may be curved or linear.
 The of involucre bracts of D. swazilandica form an inverted cone while those of D. anomola form a cell shape.
 The of flowerheads of D. swazilandica typically consist of a single capitulum while those of D. anomola consist of multiple capitula.
 The achenes of D. anomola have glands between the ribs while those of D. swazilandica don't.
 The pappus bristles of D. swazilandica broaden conspicuously at the base, while those of D. anomola don't.

Distribution and habitat 
This species is found in Eswatini and in the Mpumalanga province of South Africa.

Conservation 
This species is potentially threatened by plantations in Eswatini but occurs in a protected area in South Africa, and as such, is currently not threatened there.

References 

Flora of South Africa
Flora of Swaziland
Plants described in 2000
swazilandica